Jenn Vix (born February 4, 1967) is an American solo electronic-rock singer, songwriter, producer, and recording engineer, who has ventured into other genres including alternative rock, trip hop, darkwave, modern new wave and electro-industrial.

Early life
Born in Providence, Rhode Island, she spent her teen years in New York City.

Career
In 1984, Vix performed in Disco Donut, a one-off band, singing back-up, along with singer/songwriter Nicole Willis from Nicole Willis & The Soul Investigators, Adam Horovitz of The Beastie Boys on bass, musician Phil Painson  on drums and investigative journalist David Strahan on guitar.

Jenn Vix
Vix's first solo release was Jenn Vix, a self-titled album of 8 tracks on her own label, Umbrella, which was officially released in January 1995, through a New York–based distributor. Later it was sold on CDBaby, one of the first artists on that site. Rolling Stone gave the album 3.5 stars, saying "Vix sounds perpetually enraptured. And the Rhode Island multi-instrumentalist has reason to be. Her music--clear, simple melodies awash in echo--is all dreaminess and shuddering, and from inside its swirl, her voice wafts up lightly. Catchy but ."

The February 1995 CMJ New Music Monthly included Vix's song "Devils Chasing Angels," saying: "Vix played virtually all the instruments on her self-titled debut album (Umbrella). 'Devils Chasing Angels' is an airy, dreamy pop song, with wisps of synthesizers coiled around tendrils of Vix's trademark watery bass sound."

Hope Springs Nocturnal
Vix's second release was Hope Springs Nocturnal, officially released in October 1998 (rather than 2000 as listed on AllMusic). It is a longer release of 18 tracks.

3
Vix's third release was titled "3" and it has 10 tracks including "Doll Heart" and "Broken Angels Singing." It was released on Nov 1, 2003.

Strange Buildings
Vix's eleventh release was a five-track EP titled "Strange Buildings." It features two collaboration tracks, "The Woman with No Fear" and "Weirdo", with the original guitarist of The Psychedelic Furs, John Ashton. It was released on Bandcamp on November 16, 2015, and then officially released on November 17, 2015. Popdose said of Strange Buildings: "Vix’s voice is a wonderful instrument on its own; warm and embracing...she’s onto something truly special."

Unlocked
Vix's EP Unlocked, released in 2017 received a 5 Star rating on music-news.com. The 5 track album was celebrated for "serving up a brimming bowl of postmodern broth for your delectation." The song "unlocked" features John Ashton, original guitarist of The Psychedelic Furs. The album was co-produced by Danny Chavis of shoegaze pioneers The Veldt. The album also features the single "Complicated Man."

Singles
In 2010, Vix released a single track titled "Vampires", first exclusively at CDBaby, then in wide release.

On January 24, 2012, Vix released a fourth single track, titled "In the House of Dark Shadows". It is a collaboration with Reeves Gabrels, former guitarist for David Bowie and Tin Machine, and current guitarist of The Cure.

In 2012, Vix released a single track titled “Sick” on March 14. A year later she released a sixth single titled "Speed Of Light", her second collaboration with Reeves Gabrels. The release date was April 22, 2013.

Her seventh release was a single track collaboration with Andy Anderson, former drummer of The Cure, Iggy Pop and Hawkwind, and guitarist Mark Montalto. The track title is "Eyes Roll Back"; Popdose praised the song saying Vix's "voice is striking; warm, enveloping and emotional." The official release date was June 29, 2015, and it was pre-released on Bandcamp on March 13. It blends post-punk guitars and drums with light and sensual synthesizers.

Her eighth release was a double single, titled "F*ck, Rinse, Repeat" and "Burn." Both tracks are a collaboration with Dirk Ivens, Belgian electro-industrial pioneer from the bands Absolute Body Control, Dive, and The Klinik. Vix‘s ninth release was a single track titled "I Don't Trust You". This is yet another collaboration with the former drummer of The Cure, Andy Anderson. Pre-released on Bandcamp on June 17, 2015, then officially released on June 29, 2015, "I Don't Trust You" opts for a dark synthpop meets trip-hop approach "which frame Vix's Annie Lennox style vocals very nicely. It is a much more complex, intriguing and engaging track that more appropriately shows off the depth of Vix's songwriting skills." The tenth release was a single track, titled "Hands On My Heart (Waiting)." It was released on August 29, 2015 on Bandcamp.

Other projects

Vix has also contributed vocals and music tracks for Bob Robertson's singing skeleton group, Sindy Skinless and the Decomposers, featured on YouTube.

In January 2016, Jenn Vix performed the tracks "Strange Buildings", "Unlocked" and "The Woman With No Fear" live for WBRU's Home BRU'd; the radio station said "knows how to create an atmosphere," offering "beautiful lyrics" with "the Massive Attack influence...evident in the echoing drums." She was accompanied by Paul LF and John Ashton.

She was on the cover of Boston, MA, Noise magazine, and was the feature story; feature 291, April 22, 2009.

The video for "Vampires" was animated by cartoonist and writer, Scott Bateman.

In September 2014, Vix collaborated on a single track with guitarist Marco Pirroni, formerly of Adam and the Ants, Rema Rema and The Models. The track is a cover version of Shirley Collins' "Turpin Hero" and it is featured on the digital download of the compilation album "Shirley Inspired", official UK releases date 8 June 2015.
She has also contributed three tracks to the PBS (New England) series "Hit and Run History", featuring Andrew Giles Buckley.
Vix also recorded vocals on tracks by Rodney Linderman, known as Rodney Anonymous, of the band The Dead Milkmen in 2014.

Shy Child sampled Vix on their 2010 album, Liquid Love; The Guardian said the "Jenn Vix narrative ('I used to be in bands...') recalls how the Orb used a Rickie Lee Jones conversation in Little Fluffy Clouds."

Discography
Albums
 Jenn Vix - 1995
 Hope Springs Nocturnal – 1998
 3 - November 1, 2003
 Strange Buildings - 2015
 Unlocked - 2017
6 EP - 2019
Singles
 Vampires - 2010
 Sick - 2012
PTSD - 2021
Collaboration
 Reeves Gabrels - In the House of Dark Shadows - 2012
 “Speed of Light" - 2013
 Andy Anderson – Eyes Roll Back - 2015
 “I Don't Trust You - 2015
 Dirk Ivens - F*ck, Rinse, Repeat and “Burn - 2013
 John Ashton - The Woman With No Fear and Weirdo on the EP, Strange Buildings - 2015
Feeney Vix - Orange Is The Color Of Our Discontent - 2020

References

Musicians from Providence, Rhode Island
American women songwriters
Songwriters from Rhode Island